José Joaquín de Olmedo International Airport is an international airport serving Guayaquil, the capital of the Guayas Province and the second most populous city in Ecuador. It is the second busiest airport in Ecuador.

The airport was named after José Joaquín de Olmedo, a notable Ecuadorian poet, first mayor of Guayaquil, and former president of Ecuador. It was changed from Simón Bolívar International Airport, which is currently the name of the airports in Caracas, Venezuela, and Santa Marta, Colombia.

The runway length of  includes a  displaced threshold on Runway 21 and a  displaced threshold on Runway 03. The runway can accommodate Boeing 747 and Airbus A340-600 aircraft. The airport is in the broad delta of the Guayas River, with level terrain in all quadrants.

In July 2014, the airport domestic area was enlarged; now the airport is capable of handling up to 7.5 million passengers per year. An exit tax is levied on all international tickets, however it is no longer required to pay at the window when exiting the country.

History
The airport, which had the newest terminal in Ecuador, was renamed for José Joaquín de Olmedo in 2006, in preparation for the inauguration of the new  national and international terminal on 27 July 2006. Although there was an inaugural flight on 28 July 2006, most airlines did not operate completely from the new terminal until August 2006. After that date, the old terminal was closed and it was later turned into a convention center.

The construction of the new terminal and expansion of the runway was finally decided in 2003–2004, years after making the decision that the current infrastructure was not sufficient to cover the city's needs, but that it was not yet commercially viable to build an entirely new airport in the Daular area.

The original project in 2003–2004 contemplated the construction of a  international terminal and the continuing operation of the old terminal, which would be left to handle only domestic flights. However, it was later decided that the newer  terminal would handle both national and international traffic, and the older terminal would be closed.

The airport is planned to serve the city of Guayaquil for 10 to 15 years starting in 2006. After this, it is expected to reach a capacity of 5 million passengers a year, and when this happens a new airport will be built in the Daular area, some 20 kilometers outside the city, near the highway that connects Guayaquil to Salinas and other coastal towns.

José Joaquín de Olmedo International Airport was named "Best Airport in Latin America 2008 & 2009" by BusinessWeek and the second best in 2011. All domestic flights going from the Ecuadorian mainland to the Galápagos Islands make a stop in Guayaquil to refuel and pick up passengers due to its location, which is the closest point in Ecuador to the islands.

Airlines and destinations

Passenger

Cargo

Statistics

Accolades
 2011 – 2nd Best Airport in Latin America – Caribbean of the Airport Service Quality Awards by Airports Council International and Best Airport by Size in the 2 to 5 million passenger category.

See also
Transport in Ecuador
List of airports in Ecuador

References

External links 

José Joaquín de Olmedo International Airport at OurAirports

Autoridad Aeroportuaria de Guayaquil 
Accommodations near the airport in Guayaquil 

Airports in Ecuador
Buildings and structures in Guayaquil